Sadžida Šetić (born March 6, 1968 in Sarajevo) is a Bosnian actress. Her film credits include My Aunt in Sarajevo, Snow and Sabina K..

External links

1968 births
21st-century Bosnia and Herzegovina actresses
Actresses from Sarajevo
Bosnia and Herzegovina film actresses
Bosniaks of Bosnia and Herzegovina
Living people